Captain Vyom is an Indian television series aired on DD National in 1998. It was directed by Ketan Mehta and starred Milind Soman.

Plot
By 2123, humans have conquered the solar system and established space stations on several planets. The earth is governed by World Government, headquartered at Delhi.

As the series begins, Maya is traveling from Earth to Mars and during the journey is hit by a meteor and an unknown life-form is carried onto the spacecraft. After a successful landing on Mars she meets Astro Guru (Shrivallabh Vyas), oldest and wisest man in the world. He is also a scientist and astrologer and is trying to integrate physics and philosophy. After that Maya travels to Io, the moon of Jupiter, where she is to be the new jailer of the most secured prison in the solar system. It holds the 12 most dangerous criminals of the Universe in an incapacitated state, which are:
1. Teja / Tejang - The keeper of light (Aditya Sharma)
2. Mohini - The hypnotist (Malvika Singh)
3. Paras - The alchemist (Abhimanyu Singh)
4. Morpho - The shape-shifter (Andy Tharane)
5. Kineto - Master of telekinetic abilities (Ravi Khore)
6. Sonic - The Lord of soundwaves (Dino Morea)
7. Venom - The toxicologist (Madhu Sapre and Achint Kaur)
8. Chhalasur - The illusionist (Faredoon Dodo Bhujwala)
9. Durgati - The biologist (Sushmita Mukherjee)
10. Computo - The cyborg (Rukee Dadachanji)
11. Gravito - The gravity expert (Joy Fernandes)
12. Vikaal / Chronos - The space and time-traveler (Rahul Bose and Ken Philips).
The unknown life-form enters the prison through Maya's boots and the criminals are awakened. They are aided by an ensuing meteor shower on Io. All 12 criminals escape the prison using their abilities to disable the security system on the prison.

Captain Vyom (Milind Soman), a super soldier, is assigned by World Government and Vishwapramukh - the world President (Tom Alter) to capture the fugitives. He is unaware of his parents and considers himself an orphan. He was raised in a monastery in Ladakh and has acquired superpowers by training in Yoga. He chooses a team of exceptionally-powered soldiers to fight the criminals. The team includes Pablo (Vinod Pandit) - the pilot, Lieutenant Maya (Kartika Rane) - expert in criminal psychology, Captain Blaze (Aarav Chowdhary) - the weapons expert, Dr. Zen (Divya Palat) - the medic, Fuller (Sanjeev Vatsa) - the engineer, Syd-E - the android (Shehzaad Saeed), and Surya (Jeto Sanjana). They travel through space in a spaceship named Ulka (उल्का - meaning meteor) developed by Fuller.

The series evolves as they come across the criminals one by one and capture them. Some of them were killed while others were captured and sent back to the prison. In the end, Captain Vyom has to travel back in time to pursue the 12th inmate Vikaal (Rahul Bose) who tries to kill Chandrakanth Shastri who would later become Astro Guru, to rewrite history. The story takes a turn while on mission to save Dr. Shastri from Vikaal, Vyom encounters his look alike Dr. Om Swaroop (Milind Soman). Refusing to go back to the present even after completing the mission, he sets out to find the whereabouts of his look alike person. Soon, Vyom finds out that Dr Swaroop is actually his biological father and seeks more knowledge about his mother.

It was revealed that the whole conspiracy of turning the brightest scientists of the galaxy into the evil side and then later plot to rescue them from the Io prison was orchestrated by Kaala Saaya - the Emperor of Parajeevs. Parajeevs are an advanced alien race of body parasites from seventh dimension. Their ultimate aim is to harvest a special fluid found only in human brains, that will help them to live thousands of years. He sends his daughter Parchhayee (Nethra Raghuraman) to earth in order to kill Dr. Om Swaroop as he was the only one with knowledge of advanced weaponry, G-gun to defeat the Parajeevs. But Parchayee gets cold feet as she start to fell in love with him and deviates from the mission given to her by her father. She helps Dr. Om from the assaults and later he was taken to other dimension where the Parajeevs would not reach. Capt. Vyom who is still in the past and having complete knowledge of using G-gun help defending the earth from the first war against the aliens successfully. This event results in uniting the World Nations and eventually makes way to the formation of world Government. Meanwhile, Parchayee who is in exile with Dr. Om, becomes mother of Vyom making him half-alien.

In present time, Kaala Saya, the emperor of Parajeevs (Aliens) sends his Parajeev agent to sabotage the spaceship Ulka. He was captured by Dr. Zen, and was imprisoned in a glass bowl. After completing his mission Vyom returns to present and interrogates the Parajeev, but he did not yield. After listening to the conversation between Capt. Vyom and Dr. Zen regarding the parentage of Vyom, the Parajeev offers to help them in reaching the Seventh Dimension where the Parajeevs live, and then to defeat them. He demands an audience with Astro Guru saying he will reveal the secrets of inter-dimensional travel, and ways to defeat the Parajeevs only to Astro Guru. After revealing the secrets to the virtual form of Astro Guru, the Parajeev commits suicide.

Astro Guru then entrusts Captain Vyom and his crew to embark on another mission to collect four essential objects that would help them to reach the seventh dimension and to defeat the Parajeevs. These 4 objects are:- a weapon to defeat the Parajeevs, a jewel that will act as a compass for the inter-dimensional travel, a herb that would enable humans to breath in the seventh dimension, and a fuel that will enable Ulka for inter-dimensional travel. The crew splits into groups to collect those objects. Maya teams up with Capt. Blaze in search of the weapon, while Dr. Zen and Capt. Pablo was entrusted to bring the herb, Engineer Fuller and android Syd-E was sent to collect the fuel, while Capt. Vyom takes the responsibility of finding the jewel/ compass alone. Maya and Zen were stunned and kept as captive during their missions, while their partners returned to Ulka with the objects they sought. Engineer Fuller was consumed by a man-eating tree while collecting the fuel for the spaceship, while his partner Syd-E returns with the fuel.
 
Captain Vyom then sets out to defeat the Parajeevs. On his way, he was taken to another dimension where his father and mother lives. They give Vyom a crystal that will weaken the shield of Kaala Saaya. Eventually Captain Vyom confronts the emperor of Parajeevs - Kaala Saya, Vyom with the possession of the crystal weakens the emperor and is later revealed as the grandson of Kaalya Saaya. Kaala Saaya recognizes Vyom as the heir to the throne of seventh dimension, and finally convinces to take the responsibility as the new emperor. The series ends with Vyom the new emperor of Parajeevs, recollecting his past life adventures and hoping to meet his parents again in another dimension. Meanwhile, Maya and Dr. Zen agree to go on a date with Blaze and Pablo, respectively.

Cast 
 Captain Vyom (Milind Soman)
 Lieutenant Maya (Kartika Rane)
 Captain Blaze (Aarav Chowdhary)
 Dr. Zen (Divya Palat)
 Fuller (Sanjeev Vatsa)
 Pablo (Vinod Pandit)
 SYD-E, the android (Shahzaad Saeed)
 Surya (Jeto Sanjana)
 Shakti (Perizaad Zorabian)
 Teja / Tejang - The keeper of light (Aditya Sharma)
 Mohini - The hypnotist (Malvika Singh)
 Paras - The alchemist (Abhimanyu Raj Singh)
 Morpho - The shape-shifter (Andy Tharane)
 Kineto - Master of telekinetic abilities (Ravi Khore)
 Sonic - The Lord of soundwaves (Dino Morea)
 Venom - The toxicologist (Madhu Sapre and Achint Kaur)
 Chhalasur - The illusionist (Faredoon Bhoojwala)
 Durgati - The biologist (Sushmita Mukherjee)
 Computo - The cyborg (Rajiv Kumar)
 Gravito - The gravity expert (Joy Fernandes)
 Vikaal / Chronos - The space and time-traveler (Rahul Bose and Ken Philips)
 Vishwapramukh - the world President (Tom Alter)
 Astro Guru/Chandrakant Shastri (Shrivallabh Vyas)
Chandrakant Shastri 'Chandu'(Rahul Singh)
 Dr. Om Swaroop (Milind Soman)
 Dr. Naina (Nethra Raghuraman)
 Parchhaayee (Nethra Raghuraman)
 Kaala Saya (Sanjeev Vatsa)
 Chaya (Kartika Rane)
 Maya and Chaya's father (Sunil Rege)

Production
The futuristic science fiction show was conceived by Ketan Mehta. The special effects were created by Maya Entertainment Ltd. jointly owned by the National Film Development Corporation and Mehta. The series costed three times than the average production at that time due to special effects.

Model and actor Milind Soman was roped in to play the protagonist of the series.

Release and reception
The series aired in India on DD1 every Sunday 10 am in late 1998. The series received favorable response from audience and critics. It had considerable fan following in the 1990s. The series had rerun on SAB TV. In 2008, Soman expressed his willingness to star in the second season, film or video game if ever produced.

The remastered series was uploaded as a web series from 22 June 2016 to 13 June 2017 on YouTube channel WOW TEENZ by Cosmos Maya.

Spin-off comics
A comics based on the television series was published by Diamond Comics in English and several other Indian languages. The comics maintained the storyline of the original television series.

Future
In June 2022, it was announced that Brewing Thoughts Pvt Ltd has acquired the remake rights of Captain Vyom from Maya Entertainment Ltd and they have announced that they will make 5 films and 5 seasoned show on the 1998 TV show. Really ?

References

External links
 WOW TEENZ Youtube Channel

DD National original programming
Indian action television series
Indian science fiction television series
1998 Indian television series debuts
1999 Indian television series endings
Indian superhero television shows
Television series set in the 22nd century
Television shows set in Delhi